Tisman's Common is a hamlet in the Horsham District of West Sussex, England. It stands in the parish of Rudgwick, on the Rudgwick to Loxwood road, 6.4 miles (10.2 km) west of Horsham.

History and buildings
William Topley's Geology of the Weald notes the common is sited on a bed of sand and Calcareous Grit. Williamson, Hudson, Musson and Nairn, in their 2019 Sussex: West volume of Pevsner’s Buildings of England, describe the setting as "only a few yards from the Surrey border in thick Wealden country". The hamlet was historically part of the Tisman's Estate, centred on Tismans House, a Grade II listed building dating from the early 19th century. In the Victorian period the area was largely divided into a small number of major estates, including Tismans, Hermongers and Pallinghurst, which provided most of the local employment in agricultural activities. The estates were created in the mid-19th century by the (unusually late) enclosures of the commons of Tismans and Exfoldwood. There is a small mission house, St John's, built in the early 20th century as a place of worship for agricultural workers for whom the main church at Rudgwick was too distant, and a pub, The Mucky Duck, originally The Cricketers. Other listed buildings in the hamlet, all designated Grade II, include Barnsfold, originally a pair of labourers’ cottages dating from the 16th century, Swains Cottage and Little Swains, the former an original hall house dating from the 14th century, and Bucks Cottage.

Footnotes

References

Sources
 
 
 

Horsham District
Hamlets in West Sussex
Grade II listed buildings in West Sussex